Adolf Trotz (September 6, 1895 – after 1937) was a German film director.

Selected filmography
 Gold and Luck (1923)
 The Curse of Vererbung (1927)
 Sixteen Daughters and No Father (1928)
 The Woman in the Advocate's Gown (1929)
 Tragedy of Youth (1929)
 Somnambul (1929)
 The Right of the Unborn (1929)
 Karriere (1930)
 It Happens Every Day (1930)
 A Storm Over Zakopane (1931)
 Shooting Festival in Schilda (1931)
 Elisabeth of Austria (1931)
 Rasputin, Demon with Women (1932)
 Tatras Zauber (1933)
 Ways to a Good Marriage (1933)

External links

1895 births
Year of death unknown
German film directors
People from Nysa County